Lake Tarnița is a reservoir located in Cluj County, Romania, between the communes of Râșca, Mărișel and Gilău, west of Cluj-Napoca. Covering some 215 ha, with a length of close to 9 km and a maximum depth of over 70 m, it is a popular tourist destination. Water from the Someșul Cald River flows into the reservoir. A 97 m high dam was completed in 1974.

Notes

External links

Geography of Cluj County
Lakes of Romania
Reservoirs in Romania